Pasi Petri Kivisaari (born 23 October 1971 in Lapua) is a Finnish politician currently serving in the Parliament of Finland for the Centre Party at the Vaasa constituency.

References

1971 births
Living people
People from Lapua
Centre Party (Finland) politicians
Members of the Parliament of Finland (2019–23)